Anarestan (also Romanized as Anārestān; also known as Napastan, Narastān, and Narestān) is a village in Gilvan Rural District, in the Central District of Tarom County, Zanjan Province, Iran. At the 2006 census, its population was 171, in 40 families.

References 

Populated places in Tarom County